USA Cycling or USAC, based in Colorado Springs, Colorado, is the national governing body for bicycle racing in the United States. It covers the disciplines of road, track, mountain bike, cyclo-cross, and BMX across all ages and ability levels. In 2015, USAC had a membership of 61,631 individual members.

USA Cycling is associated with the UCI (Union Cycliste Internationale), which governs international cycling, and the United States Olympic Committee (USOC). The organization is also a member of the continental body Confederacion Panamericana de Ciclismo (COPACI). USA Cycling also organizes the USA Cycling Pro Road Tour, the top road cycling series for men and women in the United States.

History
The Amateur Bicycle League of America was organized in 1920 and incorporated in New York in 1921. In 1975, the name was changed to the United States Cycling Federation. In 1995, USA Cycling, Inc. was incorporated in Colorado, and in 1995, the two corporations merged, with USA Cycling the umbrella corporation.  National Off Road Bicycle Association, once an independent governing body of mountain bike racing in the US is now the mountain bike racing division of USA Cycling (USAC).

The office of USA Cycling, Inc. remained on the United States Olympic Training Center campus near downtown Colorado Springs until March 2009. Thanks to the generous support of Nor’wood Development group and the El Pomar Foundation combined with the collective efforts of the City of Colorado Springs and several local organizations, including the Colorado Springs Economic Development Corporation, and the Colorado Springs Sports Corporation, the national governing body secured office space on the city's north side. USA Cycling's new headquarters now consists of a 26,000-square-foot building on nearly two acres of land near I-25 on the northwest side of Colorado Springs.

Organization
USA Cycling is the official governing body for all disciplines of competitive cycling in 
the United States, including road, track, mountain bike, BMX, and cyclo-cross. The 
organization has a two-part mission: To achieve sustained success in international 
cycling competition and to grow competitive cycling in America.

The mountain bike racing division of USA Cycling was formerly NORBA, the National Off Road Bicycle Association.

As a membership-based organization, USA Cycling comprises 2,400 clubs and teams; and nearly 70,000 licensees which include officials, coaches, mechanics, and competitive cyclists of all ages and abilities across all five disciplines of the sport.

Local associations
In effort to grow the sport domestically, USA Cycling supports grass-roots initiatives through its 34 local associations (LA). Each year, USA Cycling reinvests a significant portion of its membership dollars back into these local programs, having distributed $2.5 million since its 
2003 inception.

Local and national events
Each year, USA Cycling sanctions over 2,900 events across the U.S. Additionally, the organization administers eight national-level calendars and manages 17 national championship events for all ages and skill levels in several disciplines: road, track, mountain bike, cyclo-cross, BMX and para-cycling.

A decade of growth
USA Cycling has seen steady growth over the last decade as participation in cycling has continued to grow across the nation.  The organization's 69,684 licensees in 2010 represent a 63% increase over the 42,724 from 2002.

USA Cycling maintains development programs for men and women in all disciplines of competitive cycling, providing a structured pathway to the top tier of the sport. In 2010, 266 individual riders took part in USA Cycling's National Development Program, gaining valuable race experience through 1900 fully supported race days.

Regional and national development camps
Serving as entry points into USA Cycling's National Development Program pathway, the Regional and National Development Camps aim to identify talent and, in some cases, name riders to USA Cycling rosters for major international competitions.

International race camps
USA Cycling takes dozens of juniors on international racing trips each year. These riders gain race experience at the world's top junior events, including Junior Paris-Roubaix and the Tour de L’Abitibi.

European resident programs
Nearly 200 American cyclists live and train out of USA Cycling's houses in Belgium, Italy, and Germany each season. This allows them to be fully immersed in European race culture—a necessary element for advancing to the top tier of professional cycling.

Racing levels
USA Cycling racing levels are called categories, sometimes referred to as "cats". The lowest category for road, track, and cyclocross racing is 5 for men and women. The lowest category for mountain bike racing is 3 for both sexes. Decreasing categories represent higher ability levels with category 1 being the immediate step below professional level.

Advancement
Advancement to higher categories is based on experience, and is shown below.

Road
Upgrading from category 5 to 4 can be done after finishing ten mass start races. Category 4 to 3 can be requested when a certain number of points are earned in races within a 12-month period or race experience, 25 qualifying races with a minimum of 10 top ten finishes with fields of 30 riders or more. 30 points in a 12-month period is an automatic upgrade to category 3. Upgrades from 3 to 2 and 2 to 1 are based on a number of points in a 12-month period. Category 3 to 2 requires 25 points to be eligible and 40 points for an automatic upgrade.

Cyclo-cross
Upgrading in cyclo-cross follows the same upgrade pattern as road but with different points requirements. In this case it is 10 points in a 12-month period to upgrade from category 3 to 2 and 20 points from category 2 to 1.

Track
Upgrading from track category 5 to 4 is done by taking a velodrome safety course or 4 race days, and as with road, is done by points with the added requirement of 5 race days.

Mountain bike
Riders may upgrade to category 2 as fast as they want. After 5 top-5 finishes as a category 3 rider, a rider must upgrade to category 2. After 2 top-5 category 2 finishes, a rider may upgrade to category 1, and after 5 top-5 finishes a rider must upgrade to category 1.

See also
National Collegiate Cycling Association
United States men's national cycling team
United States records in track cycling

References

External links
  USA Cycling web site

National members of the Pan American Cycling Confederation
Sports organizations established in 1920
Cycle racing in the United States
Organizations based in Colorado Springs, Colorado
Sports in Colorado Springs, Colorado
Cycling
Cycle racing organizations
Mountain biking events in the United States
Cycling organizations in the United States